In chemistry, cyclic(alkyl)(amino)carbenes (CAACs) are a family of stable singlet carbene ligands developed by the research group of Guy Bertrand in 2005 at UC Riverside. In marked contrast with the popular N-heterocyclic carbenes (NHCs) which possess two "amino" substituents adjacent to the carbene center, CAACs possess one "amino" substituent and an sp3 carbon atom "alkyl". This specific configuration makes the CAACs very good σ-donors (higher HOMO) and π-acceptors (lower LUMO) when compared to NHCs. Moreover the reduced heteroatom stabilization of the carbene center in CAACs versus NHCs also gives rise to a smaller ΔEST (48.3 vs 72.7 kcal mol-1).

Synthesis 
The original preparation of CAACs precursors (Route 1) begins with condensation of 2,6-diisopropylaniline and 2-methylpropanal. Deprotonation of this aldimine with lithium diisopropylamide gives an aza-allyl anion, which ring opens 1,2-epoxy-2-methylpro-pane.  The resulting lithium alkoxide is then treated with triflic anhydride to generate the aldiminium salt. Another methods (Route 2) involves alkylation of the aldimine with 3-bromo-2-methylpropene to generate an alkenyl aldimine, which cyclises to the corresponding iminium salts in the presence of HCl upon heating.,, This straightforward approach allows for kilogram-scale syntheses of CAAC precursors. Finally, deprotonation of the minimum salts with potassium bis(trimethylsilyl)amide affords the free carbene as a white solid. CAAC free carbenes are air and moisture sensitive but can be stored for weeks under an inert atmosphere.

Family of CAAC ligands 

Since 2005, the family of cyclic (alkyl)(amino)carbenes expended to encompass the functionalized FunCAACs, the BiCAACs with a bicyclic backbone, the CAAC-6s with a 6-membered backbone, and the chiral ChiCAACs used in asymmetric catalysis.

Applications 
In recent years, cyclic (alkyl)(amino)carbenes have found numerous applications ranging from the stabilization of highly reactive species, to homogeneous catalysis and materials., Better σ-donors and π-acceptors than the well-known N-heterocyclic carbenes (NHCs), these stable singlet carbene are well known for stabilising highly reactive species, such as highly reactive low valent complexes, and main group radicals.

As ligand for transition metal catalysts, they distinguished themselves in ruthenium catalysis ethenolysis processes where CAACs proved to be superior compared to NHCs reaching up to 340000 TONs. Note that this was the first time ruthenium metathesis catalysts exhibited high performance in cross‐metathesis reactions employing ethylene gas, with activities sufficient for the industrial‐scale production of linear α‐olefins (LAOs) and other terminal‐olefin products.

More recently, CAACs have been shown by Di et al. and Thompson et al. to generate very efficient OLEDs materials with d10-coinage metals. Traditionally, OLED devices rely on expensive heavy transition metals such as iridium, platinum, or ruthenium which are not sustainable. Consequently, the development of d10-coinage metal alternatives is inherently more advantageous .

It was also demonstrated that their ambiphilic nature allows them to participate in the activation of enthalpically strong E-H bonds (E: N, P, Si, …), a distinctive feature traditionally reserved to transition metals. It was also shown that bulky CAACs promote the reverse transformation,  a formal reductive elimination of E-H bonds at carbon, further delineating the parallel with transition metals.

References 

Heterocyclic compounds with 1 ring
Nitrogen heterocycles
Carbenes